"A Trip To Paradise" is an American television play broadcast on March 26, 1959 as part of the CBS television series, Playhouse 90.  The cast includes Susan Oliver and Burt Brinckerhoff. Buzz Kulik is the director, and the teleplay is written by Adrian Spies.

Plot
A troubled teenage boy, Raymond Austin, meets a Ellie, a provocative teenage beauty who introduces him to delinquents and youthful "beatniks".

Cast
The cast included the following:<

 Susan Oliver - Ellie
 Burt Brinckerhoff - Raymond Austin
 Martha Scott - Mrs. Austin
 Buddy Ebsen - Froelich
 Martin Balsam - Harkavy

Production
The program was presented on March 26, 1959, on the CBS television series Playhouse 90. The teleplay was written by Adrian Spies.

Reviews
Television critic William Ewald of the UPI called it "a neat little package", but "perhaps a little too neat, equipped as it was with pat ending and tidy moral, but it was a pretty rewarding excursion into the world of a teen-ager fumbling his way toward maturity."

References

1959 American television episodes
Playhouse 90 (season 3) episodes
1959 television plays